Herz Bergner (1907–1970) was a novelist who was born in Radymno, Kingdom of Galicia and Lodomeria in 1907. His family moved to Vienna, Austria, at the start of World War I, and returned to Poland at the end of the war. Bergner's brother, Melech Ravitch, a Yiddish writer, emigrated to Australia in 1933. Herz Bergner followed him in 1938, originally to raise funds for Jewish secular schools in Poland. Once in Australia Bergner met Pinchus Goldhar and other Yiddish writers and, together with Abraham Schulman and Goldhar, began the literary publication Oyfboy which was published in Melbourne.

In 1948 Bergner was awarded the ALS Gold Medal for his novel Between Sky and Sea.

Herz Bergner died in 1970.

Bibliography

Novels
 Between Sky and Sea (1946)
 Light and Shadow (1963)

Short story collection
 The New House (1941)
 Where the Truth Lies (1966)

Awards
 1948 winner ALS Gold Medal – Between Sky and Sea

References

Australian male novelists
Australian people of Polish-Jewish descent
ALS Gold Medal winners
Jewish Australian writers
Polish emigrants to Australia
Writers from Melbourne
Yiddish-language writers
1907 births
1970 deaths
People from Radymno
People from the Kingdom of Galicia and Lodomeria
Austro-Hungarian Jews
Jews from Galicia (Eastern Europe)